Mount Elder is a  mountain lying between Endurance Glacier and Mount Pendragon on Elephant Island, in the South Shetland Islands of Antarctica. It was named by the UK Antarctic Place-Names Committee for Captain John P. Elder, Royal Engineers, surveyor of the U.K. Joint Services Expedition to Elephant Island in 1970–71.

Important Bird Area

References

Mountains of the South Shetland Islands
Elephant Island
Important Bird Areas of Antarctica
Penguin colonies